McDaniel v. Paty, 435 U.S. 618 (1978), was a United States Supreme Court case that struck down the last remaining state restriction against religious ministers holding elected office.

Background 
McDaniel was a Baptist minister from Chattanooga, Tennessee. He filed as a candidate to be a delegate to the 1977 Tennessee State Constitutional Convention. His opponent successfully challenged his candidacy based on a state law that forbade ordained ministers from elected office.

Decision 
In an 8–0 decision, the court ruled that the state law violated both the First and Fourteenth Amendments. A modified version of the statute, prohibiting "ministers of the Gospel" from serving in the Tennessee legislature, remains as Article IX, Section 1. of the Tennessee State Constitution.

A measure on the November 2022 ballot proposes to remove this restriction. In accordance with state constitutional law, the proposed amendment was submitted to the state legislature in both the 2019–2020 and 2021–2022 sessions. The measure received nearly universal support and was ratified by the voters.

References

External links
 

History of Chattanooga, Tennessee
United States free exercise of religion case law
United States Supreme Court cases
United States Supreme Court cases of the Burger Court
1978 in religion
1978 in United States case law